The Edgewood Stakes is a Grade II American Thoroughbred horse race for three-year-old fillies run over a distance of  miles on turf held annually in early May on the Kentucky Oaks day meeting at Churchill Downs in Louisville, Kentucky during the spring meeting.

History
The event is named after a neighborhood on the south side of Louisville known as Edgewood.
The event was inaugurated on 9 July 1983 as run on the dirt track, was won by the favorite Migola, ridden by Iowa born jockey Garth Patterson by a margin of two lengths in a fast time of 1:44. 

The event was not held in 1986 or 1990 and in 1991 the event was scheduled in June.

In 1998 the event was moved to the turf track. After years of instability with regards to the scheduling of the event, in 2002 Churchill Downs administration scheduled the event to be on the undercard of the Kentucky Oaks day meeting.

In 2015 the event was classified as Grade III.

Records
Speed record:
 miles:  1:40.94 - Stephanie's Kitten (2012)
 1 mile (turf):  1:35.35 - Forest Shadows  (2003)
 1 mile (dirt):  1:35.40 - Darien Miss (1988)

Margins
 6 lengths - Weekend Delight (1985), Darien Miss (1988), Curtains Drawn (1991), Solar Bound (1999) 

Most wins by a jockey:
 4 - Larry Melancon (1984, 2000, 2001, 2003)

Most wins by a trainer:
  7 - William I. Mott (1984, 1998, 1999, 2001, 2002, 2008, 2010)

Most wins by an owner:
 2 - William S. Farish III (1985, 1996)
 2 - Lewis G. Lakin (2001, 2010)
 2 - Zayat Stable (2008, 2011)

Winners 

Legend:

See also
 List of American and Canadian Graded races

References

Open mile category horse races
Horse races in Kentucky
Grade 3 stakes races in the United States
Graded stakes races in the United States
Recurring sporting events established in 1983
Churchill Downs horse races
1983 establishments in Kentucky
Turf races in the United States